Arnold Philip Hano (March 2, 1922 – October 24, 2021) was an American editor, novelist, biographer and journalist, best known for his non-fiction work A Day in the Bleachers, a critically acclaimed eyewitness account of Game 1 of the 1954 World Series, centered on its pivotal play, Willie Mays' famous catch and throw. The author of several sports biographies, and frequent contributor to such publications as The New York Times, Sport, Sports Illustrated,  and TV Guide, Hano was, in 1963, both a Hillman Prize  winner and NSSA's Magazine Sportswriter of the Year. He was also Baseball Reliquary's 2012 Hilda Award recipient and a 2016 inductee into its Shrine of the Eternals.

Early life and education
Hano was born in Manhattan on March 2, 1922.  His father, Alfred Barnard Hano, worked as a lawyer and was employed as a salesman during the Great Depression; his mother, Clara (Millhauser), was a housewife.  Hano  spent his pre-school years in northern Manhattan's Washington Heights, in close proximity to both the Polo Grounds and Yankee Stadium. A Yankee fan at four, Hano responded to New York's 1926 World Series loss by switching his allegiance from the Yankees to the Giants, where it remained lifelong. That same year, his family moved from Manhattan to the Bronx, where it would remain for more than a decade, precisely the period which, by Hano's own reckoning, comprised his formative years.

By age three, Hano had learned to read under the tutelage of his six-and-a-half-year-old brother, Alfred Jr. By the time he was eight, Hano was writing news stories for his brother's mimeographed weekly, The Montgomery Avenue News, albeit stories paraphrased from published newspaper articles. Before long, he grew tired of recycling other people's ideas. Once again, his brother encouraged him:

So I invented a cop who would always fall to his knees when he shot the bad guy and I called it Sitting Bull. It was my first pun. [...] I did about six or seven of these episodic things. I was eight years old, writing the equivalent of a novel for a street newspaper that we sold for a nickel a copy, door-to-door.

The brothers' journalistic venture soon ran its course, and the writing muse receded, for the time being. Hano attended DeWitt Clinton High School, graduating in 1937, and started that fall at Long Island University's Brooklyn campus. However, his initial plan to pursue a career in medicine soon fell by the wayside.

One day I wandered into the newspaper office, and they were laughing. I didn’t know you were allowed to have fun. They were enjoying themselves, so I changed from a science major to an English journalism major in my sophomore year. I became the sports editor of the college weekly in my junior year, and senior year I was editor-in-chief with another guy.

For a budding sportswriter, the timing proved particularly fortuitous when LIU's basketball team won the recently established National Invitational Tournament (NIT) in two of those three years.
Hano wrote later "I didn't know how or what – would it be a newspaper, or freelance, or a novelist, but I knew I'd write." Hano went on to earn his Bachelor's degree, graduating cum laude in 1941.

Career
That summer, Hano was employed as a copy boy by the New York Daily News. Once his sports background was established, Hano's duties were expanded accordingly. Accompanying the News photographer to sporting events, he was now tasked with providing captions for those shots he brought back to the office, thus affording the nineteen-year-old undreamt of opportunities to chronicle baseball history. Hano wrote almost 70 years later:

I'm the luckiest fan in the history of the world. When I was a copy boy at the Daily News, I was sitting in the Ebbetts Field press box when that ball got away from Mickey Owen.

Interrupted in these endeavors by the United States' entry into World War II, Hano followed his brother into the armed forces in 1942 (Alfred, to the Air Force; Arnold, the Army), eventually serving in an artillery battalion of the Seventh Infantry Division, participating in the Aleutian Islands Campaign and later landing in the first wave on Kwajalein Atoll. Shortly after that battle, informed that his brother was missing in action on a mission over Germany, Hano successfully applied to be commissioned as an infantry officer at Fort Benning, thus allowing him to be deployed to the European Theater, where he hoped to find his brother. However, before this plan could be realized, the war ended and Alfred's remains were recovered.

After his discharge, Hano returned to New York and a career in book publishing, first as managing editor with Bantam (1947–49), then as editor-in-chief with Lion Books (1949–54). In the latter capacity, Hano served as editor for, among others, novelists C. M. Kornbluth, David Goodis, David Karp and Jim Thompson. Thompson, in particular, would benefit from Hano's input and support, which sparked an unprecedented period of productivity.

It was during this period, specifically August 1951, that Hano debuted as an author with the baseball-themed young adult novel, The Big Out, described by The New York Times reviewer Ralph Adams Brown as "one of the most thrilling sports novels this reviewer has ever read."

But it was 1954 that proved to be the turning point for Hano; he left Lion Books, determined to sink or swim on the strength of his writing. What gave rise to this sudden resolve was an across-the-board ten per cent pay cut imposed by Martin Goodman. But by far the most important event that year – or at least the most pertinent to Hano's emergence as a writer – was Game 1 of the 1954 World Series, Hano's handwritten record of which would form the basis for his breakthrough book, A Day in the Bleachers, published the following year. Notwithstanding poor marketing and disappointing sales, the book was embraced almost without exception by critics  and has since come to be regarded as a classic of sports literature, with new editions published in 1982, 2004, and again in 2006. Moreover, the book's signature passage, its description of Willie Mays' most famous play, has been, and continues to be, frequently cited, quoted, or reprinted in full.

Buoyed by the book's enthusiastic reception, Hano began to establish himself as a freelance writer, his work appearing in publications such as The Saturday Evening Post,  Esquire, The New York Times, the Los Angeles Times, TV Guide, Sport, Sports Illustrated, Seventeen, Good Housekeeping, Boys' Life, Argosy, Saga Magazine, and True's Baseball Yearbook. Willie Mays was also the subject of one of several sports biographies written by Hano during the nineteen sixties and seventies, the others being Sandy Koufax, Roberto Clemente, Kareem Abdul-Jabbar and Muhammad Ali. Moreover, Hano was a frequent contributor to Lion Books' annual paperback series, Baseball Stars of 19 _ _ (later published by Pyramid Books), providing forty of its chapter-long player profiles between 1958 and 1975. In addition, Hano wrote one book—Greatest Giants of Them All, published in 1967—composed entirely of such chapter-length biographies.

Alongside this, Hano wrote at least three screenplay novelizations (see below under Books) based on Marriage Italian Style (1966), Bandolero! (1969) and Running Wild (1973). All were published by Popular Library under the Hano by-line. There may have been others written pseudonymously.

On April 7, 1964, Hano was named 1963's Magazine Sportswriter of the Year by the National Sportscasters and Sportswriters Association. Two weeks later, he received the 1963 Sidney Hillman Memorial Award in the category of magazine journalism (as selected by judges Alan Barth, William Shirer and Howard K. Smith), for "The Burned Out Americans", a muckraking study of conditions facing migratory farm workers in California's Central Valley.

Hano has also taught writing at the University of Southern California, Pitzer College, and the University of California, Irvine. Between 1989 and 1992, Hano was a contributing editor at Orange Coast Magazine.

In 2012, Hano became the 12th recipient of Baseball Reliquary's annual Hilda Award, established in 2001 "to recognize distinguished service to the game by a fan." Four years later, with his induction into the Shrine of the Eternals, Hano became the first person to be honored twice by the Baseball Reliquary.

On July 19, 2015, The Huffington Post announced the upcoming release of Hano! A Century in the Bleachers (circa fall 2015 with a November 2015 DVD release), a documentary examination of Arnold Hano's life and work, produced and directed by Jon Leonoudakis. Among its interviewees are Hano and fellow sportswriters Ron Rapoport, Ray Robinson, John Schulian, Al Silverman and George Vecsey, plus artist Mark Ulriksen, and  former Major League stars (and subjects of multiple Hano magazine articles) Orlando Cepeda and Felipe Alou.

Personal life
Hano had two children (Stephen A. and Susan C. Hano) by his first marriage, and a daughter, Laurel, by his second, the former Bonnie Abraham. Since September 1955, the Hanos had resided in Laguna Beach, the sole exception being a two-year Peace Corps stint spent in Costa Rica, starting in July 1991.

Active in community affairs ever since their arrival, Hano was instrumental in writing and promoting a 1971 voter initiative establishing a 36-foot height limit on new buildings; with close to 62 percent of the city's registered voters participating, the measure was approved by a better than 3-to-1 margin. In 2013, Hano and his wife were honored as Laguna Beach "Citizens of the Year" in the city's annual Patriot's Day Parade.

Hano died on October 24, 2021, at his home in Laguna Beach, California.  He was 99 years old.

Notes

References

Further reading

Articles

Written by Hano

 "Hanging Ten at Coronado". Boys' Life. July 1965. pp. 22–23.
 Whittaker, James (with Hano). "Fit to Climb a Mountain". Boys' Life. March 1966. pp. 34–35, 38–39.
 "Roberto Clemente: Baseball's Brightest Superstar". Boys' Life. March 1968. pp. 24–25 and 54.
 "Scouting in Tahiti". Boys' Life. February 1969. pp. 34–37.
 "Model–A Explorers of Orinda". Boys' Life. October 1969. pp. 32–33.
 "Who's No. 1? C-O-M-P-T-O-N!". Boys' Life. February 1970. pp. 26–27 and 57–58.
 "Madrid: The City Simpatico". Boys' Life. January 1970. pp. 34, 75–76.
 "That's Our Good Boy Scout Talking". Scouting. February 1971. pp. 33–35.
 "Why is Archie Bunker So Lovable". The Chicago Tribune. Sunday, March 12, 1972. Section 1A, pp. 1 and 6.
 "By the Light of the Midnight Sun". Boys' Life. February 1973. pp. 32–33, 70–73.
 "Bill McChesney: The Little Machine". Boys' Life. October 1976. pp. 26–29.
 "Greg Louganis: Diving Sensation at 16". Boys' Life. August 1977. pp. 28–31.
 "The Magical World of Greg Wilson". Boys' Life. October 1978. pp. 20–23.
 "Her First Name is Chief". Scouting. Volume 74, Number 1, January–February 1986. pp. 21–24.
 Cosby, Bill (with Hano). "High School Was a Load of Laughs". Boys' Life. December 1986. pp. 42–44.
 "Coasting: Exercising Restraint". Orange Coast Magazine. October 1989. pp. 158–160.
 "In Retrospect: Serving Time in the Jury Box". Orange Coast Magazine. October 1990. pp. 192–195.
 "In Retrospect: Life with Alfie". Orange Coast Magazine. November 1990. pp. 232–234.
 "In Retrospect: Over 26,000 Served". Orange Coast Magazine. December 1990. pp. 325–327.
 "A Love Affair With the Press". Orange Coast Magazine. February 1991. pp. 152–154.
 "In Retrospect: Jim Thompson Stories Don't Have Happy Endings". Orange Coast Magazine. March 1991. pp. 165–167.
 "In Retrospect: Three Score and Nine". Orange Coast Magazine. April 1991. pp. 150–151.
 "In Retrospect: Views From Abroad". Orange Coast Magazine. May 1991. pp. 165–167.
 "OC Forum: O.C. Can You Say?". Orange Coast Magazine. July 1991. p. 8.
 "In Retrospect: Loose Ends". Orange Coast Magazine. August 1991. pp. 142–143.
 "In Retrospect: Live From Costa Rica". Orange Coast Magazine. September 1991. pp. 149–151.
 "In Retrospect: Mi Familia". Orange Coast Magazine. November 1991. p. 157–158.
 "In Retrospect: Ya Voy Already". Orange Coast Magazine. March 1992. pp. 144–145, 147, 149.
 "In Retrospect: Juan Valdez Would Have Starved to Death". Orange Coast Magazine. May 1992. pp. 120–123 and 125.
 "In Retrospect: Much Ado About Nothing". Orange Coast Magazine. June 1992. pp. 152, 154–155.
 "The View From the Stands". Los Angeles Times. April 2, 2006.
 Hano, Bonnie; Hano, Arnold. "Our Raymond, Our Friend". RaymondLieberman@Blogspot.com. Wednesday, May 10, 2010.

Written about Hano
 McLellan, Dennis. "Living On Peace Work : Laguna Beach Couple Join the Ranks of Corps' Older Recruits". Los Angeles Times. June 21, 1991. 
 Vecsey, George. "Hazy Sunshine, Vivid Memory".  The New York Times. September 29, 2004.
 Epting, Chris. "Back to the Bleachers," Pts. 1 and 2. Los Angeles Times. August 27, 2006. 
 Waddles, Hank. "Bronx Banter Interview: Arnold Hano, Part I". Alex Belth's Bronx Banter. September 25, 2009.
 Waddles, Hank. "Bronx Banter Interview: Arnold Hano, Part II".
 Nolan, Michelle (2010). "Arnold Hano's Innovative 'The Big Out'". Ball Tales: A Study of Baseball, Basketball and Football Fiction of the 1930s through 1960s. . pp. 50–53. .
 Henrikson, Maggi. "Arnold Hano and his infectious zest for life". Laguna Life and People. February 3, 2015.
 Alderton, Bryce. "Man who covered the greats now in the spotlight". Laguna Beach Coast Pilot. September 17, 2015.

Books
Non-fiction
 A Day in the Bleachers by Arnold Hano (Da Capo Press, 1955, 2004). .
Fiction (all paperback except as indicated)
 The Big Out, sports novel by Arnold Hano (Barnes hardcover, 1951)
 Valley of Angry Men, western novel as by Matthew Gant (Gold Medal Books, 1953)
 The Flesh Painter, historical novel about artist Paul Gauguin as by Ad Gordon (Lion Library Books, 1953)
 Slade, western novel as by Ad Gordon (Lion Library Books, 1956)
 So I'm a Heel, noir thriller as by Mike Heller (Gold Medal Books, 1957)
 The Manhunter, western novel as by Matthew Gant (Signet Books, 1957)
 Flint, western novel as by Gil Dodge (Signet Books, 1957)
 The Last Notch, western novel as by Matthew Gant (Pyramid Books, 1958); reissued as by Arnold Hano (Stark House, 2017)
 The Raven and the Sword, historical novel about politician Sam Houston as by Matthew Gant (Coward-McCann hardcover, 1960; Signet Books paperback reprint, 1961)
 Queen Street, non-genre novel as by Matthew Gant (Regency Books, 1963)
 The Executive, non-genre novel by Arnold Hano (Signet Books, 1964)
 Marriage Italian Style by Arnold Hano, inferred novelization of the uncredited screenplay by Eduardo De Filippo, Renato Castellani, Tonino Guerra, Leo Benvenuti and Piero De Bernardi (Popular Library, 1965)
 Bandolero! by Arnold Hano, novelization of the Western movie screenplay by James Lee Barrett, from a story by Stanley Hough (Popular Library, 1967)
 Running Wild by Arnold Hano, novelization of the screenplay by Finley Hunt, Robert McCahon and Maurice Tomeragel from a story by McCahon (Popular Library, 1973)
 3 Steps to Hell by Arnold Hano, omnibus edition reprint of three novels: So I'm a Heel, Flint, and The Big Out  (Stark House, 2012)

External links

 
 "10 Minutes with Arnold Hano: Thoughts on the Baseball Reliquary" at Vimeo
 "'It Takes a Villager'; Arnold Hano addressing the Laguna Beach Historical Society (Sep. 24, 2013)" at YouTube
 Trailer for "Hano! A Century in the Bleachers" at YouTube

1922 births
2021 deaths
20th-century American biographers
20th-century American male writers
20th-century American novelists
21st-century American Jews
American book editors
American columnists
American environmentalists
American freelance journalists
American magazine journalists
American male biographers
American male journalists
American male novelists
American non-fiction environmental writers
Baseball writers
DeWitt Clinton High School alumni
Jewish American academics
Jewish American sportspeople
Jewish American writers
Long Island University alumni
Novelists from New York (state)
Peace Corps volunteers
People from Laguna Beach, California
People from Washington Heights, Manhattan
Pitzer College faculty
Writers from the Bronx
Sportswriters from California
Sportswriters from New York (state)
United States Army non-commissioned officers
United States Army personnel of World War II
University of California, Irvine faculty
University of Southern California faculty
Writers from Manhattan